This list of countries by Global Militarization Index is based on the 2022 Global Militarization Index of the Bonn International Center for Conversion.

2022 list

See also

Arms industry
Military budget

References

External links
 Global Militarization Index website

Global militarization
Global Militarization Index